Elena Radonicich (born February 5, 1985 in Moncalieri, Piedmont) is an Italian actress.

Early life and career
Born in Moncalieri to an Italian father of Slavic-German origins and an Italian mother, she graduated in 2009 at the Centro Sperimentale di Cinematografia in Rome. From 2005 to 2011 she acted in the theater and covered some roles on TV, before making her debut in the cinema with All at Sea by Matteo Cerami. In 2012 she is the protagonist of Workers - Pronti a tutto and Tutto parla di te, in which she plays the role of a young mother who faces difficulties of motherhood and begins a path of maturation. In 2013 she stars in Adriano Olivetti - La forza di un sogno by Michele Soavi, and in 1992 by Giuseppe Gagliardi, while in 2014 she is in the cast of Italo.

In 2015 she took part in the film Alaska by Claudio Cupellini and starred in Banat - The Journey. In 2016 she starred in the TV miniseries Luisa Spagnoli by Lodovico Gasparini. In 2017 she is in the cast of Carmine Elia's La porta rossa, in which she plays the policewoman Stella Mariani, and in the TV series 1993. In 2018 she plays Enrica "Puny" Rignon, first wife of Fabrizio De André, in the film Fabrizio De André - Principe libero. She then participates in the 2018 Cannes Film Festival with the film In My Room, nominated for the Un Certain Regard award. In 2019 she is in the cast of the short film La strada vecchia, which won the prize for best short film in the "I Love GAI" competition at the 76th Venice International Film Festival 2019.

Personal life
She is dating the actor , with whom in 2015 she had a daughter, Anna.

Filmography

Films 
 Il solitario as Lover' s Girl (2008)
All at Sea as Alina (2011)
Tutto parla di te as Emma (2012)
Workers - Pronti a tutto (2012)
Racconti d'amore (2013)
 Italo  as Laura (2014)
 Alaska  as Francesca (2015)
 Banat (The Journey) as Clara (2015)
 In My Room (2018)
 Parents in Progress (2019)

Television 
 Stracult (2008)
 Faccia d'angelo as  Grazia (2012)
 Nero Wolfe: Coppia di spade as  Carla Tormic (2012)
 Altri tempi as Viola (2013)
 Adriano Olivetti - La forza di un sogno (2013)
   1992  as  Giulia Castello (2015)
 Pietro Mennea - La freccia del Sud as Manuela Olivieri (2015)
 Luisa Spagnoli  (2016)

Videoclip 
 Nina – Baroque (2012)

References

External links

1985 births
21st-century Italian actresses
Italian film actresses
Italian stage actresses
Italian television actresses
Living people
People from Moncalieri